Waleed El-Ansary is an Egyptian-American scholar of comparative religion, Islam and Islamic economics and the Helal, Hisham and Laila Edris El-Swedey University Chair in Islamic studies at Xavier University in Cincinnati, Ohio.

Biography

El-Ansary graduated with a B.A. in economics in 1986 from George Washington University and received his M.A. in the same discipline from the University of Maryland in 1998. He earned his Ph.D. in human sciences in 2006 from George Washington University with a special concentration on Islamic studies.  Ansary has served as an assistant professor of Islamic studies at the University of South Carolina and was an adjunct professor of Islamic Economics at Cordoba University's Graduate School of Islamic and Social Sciences. He was a research scholar at the Islamic Research Institute in Washington, D.C. and has also served as a consultant to the Royal Court of Jordan and the Grand Mufti of Egypt.

Works
 The Spiritual Significance of Jihad in the Islamic Approach to Markets and the Environment (2006) 
 Muslim and Christian Understanding: Theory and Application of A Common Word (2010)
 Knowing the Religion of the Other (first published in French as "Connaître la religion de l'Autres" in 2018) with Alexis Blum, Grand Rabbi Emeritus of Neuilly and Bishop Claude Dagens, Bishop of Angouleme (Sponsored by UNESCO)
 "Linking Ethics and Economics: The Role of Ijtihad in the Regulation and Correction of Capital Markets" (Occasional Paper) Center for Muslim-Christian Understanding Georgetown University (1999)
 "The Economics of Terrorism: How bin Laden is Changing the Rules of the Game" in Islam, Fundamentalism, and the Betrayal of Tradition (2004)
 "A perennialist perspective on religion and conflict" in European View (December, 2007)
 "Can Our Science and Economics Honor Nature?" in Renovatio (April, 2017)
 "Hindu and Islamic Economics: On the Need for a New Economic Paradigm" in the Muslim World, (April, 2017)
 Recovering the Islamic Economic Intellectual Heritage: Problems and Possibilities
 The Quantum Enigma and the Islamic Sciences of Nature.
 The Economics of Clash of Civilizations : Reexamining Religion and Violence

See also
 Masudul Alam Choudhury

References

External links
 Official web page at Xavier University 

Year of birth missing (living people)
Living people
American people of Egyptian descent
American religion academics
Scholars of Islamic banking
Xavier University faculty
American Muslims
21st-century Muslim theologians
George Washington University alumni
University System of Maryland alumni
Muslim scholars of Islamic studies